Six vessels of the Royal Navy have been named HMS Jamaica, after the island colony of Jamaica:

 , a 14-gun sloop launched in 1710 and wrecked in 1715
 , a 14-gun sloop launched 1744 and foundered 1770 off Jamaica
 , a 16-gun sloop purchased in 1779 and sold in 1783
 HMS Jamaica, formerly the French 26-gun corvette , which  captured in February 1796; she was taken in as a 26-gun sixth rate and sold in 1814.
 , a 52-gun fourth rate ordered in 1825 and cancelled in 1829
 , a  launched in 1940 and scrapped in 1960

References

Royal Navy ship names